Robert T. Stafford White Rocks National Recreation Area is a United States National Recreation Area located in southern Vermont, United States, within the Green Mountain National Forest. Both the Peru Peak Wilderness and the Big Branch Wilderness areas are within the recreation area. 

The White Rocks National Recreation Area was created by the Vermont Wilderness Act of 1984. On January 17, 2006 President George W. Bush signed , which renamed the park to the Robert T. Stafford White Rocks National Recreation Area, after Robert Stafford, former Governor of Vermont, United States Representative, and U.S. Senator.

Recreational activities include camping and hiking on a 30-mile (48 kilometer) section of the Appalachian Trail that traverses the recreation area. There are also 61 miles (97.6 kilometers) of maintained snowmobile trails within the recreation area. Chaos Canyon is a cleft in a giant quartzite rockslide in the Area.

References

External links 
 Green Mountain National Forest: Recreational Activities
 The Library of Congress: Congressional Record 109th Congress (2005-2006)

National Recreation Areas of the United States
Protected areas of Bennington County, Vermont
Protected areas of Rutland County, Vermont
Protected areas of Windsor County, Vermont
Green Mountain National Forest
Protected areas established in 1984
1984 establishments in Vermont